GNC1 was the premier class in the 2015-16 AMA Grand National Championship for professional motorcycle flat track racing in the United States.

The GNC1 class debuted in the 2015 season, replacing the previous Expert division and combining both singles and twins events in a unified championship.

In GNC1, twin-cylinder motorcycles were the primary machines and were used for Mile and Half-Mile circuits while single-cylinder motorcycles were used for Short Track and TT events. Since 2017 the GNC1 class has been replaced by the new AFT Twins class, featuring twin-cylinder motorcycles at all events.

GNC1 Twins

Eligible engines

As of May 20, 2016

Aprilia
RSV 1000 R
RXV 550 / SXV 550 
BMW F800
Buell Motorcycle Company
XB9
XB12
XB3
Ducati
Desmodue 803
Desmodue Evo 1100
Desmoquattro 748
Testastretta 749, 821, 848, 939
Harley-Davidson
XR-750 (race-only engine)
XG750
883
XR1200
Honda
NC700X
RS750 (race-only engine)
Indian
Scout FTR750 (race-only engine)
Scout 60
Kawasaki
Ninja 650R
KTM
LC8
Suzuki
SV650
SV1000
TL1000
Triumph
Bonneville 865 (air-cooled)
Bonneville 900 (liquid-cooled)
Yamaha
TDM
FZ-07

Engine displacement

550-1250cc with the following restrictions: racing-only engines (Harley-Davidson XR750, Honda RS750, and Indian Motorcycle Race 750) may not exceed 750cc, engines greater than 1000cc are restricted to air/oil cooled.

Minimum weight

300 pounds (136 kg) including fuel.

Tires

Dunlop DT3 19-inch flat track tires.

Fuel

Sunoco Supreme 112

GNC1 Singles

Eligible motorcycles
Honda CRF450R
Husqvarna FC450
Kawasaki KX450F
KTM 450 SX-F
KTM 450 XC
Suzuki RM-Z 450
Yamaha YZ450F
Zaeta 450DT

Engine displacement

Minimum weight

Tires

Dunlop DT3 19-inch flat track tires.

Fuel

Sunoco Supreme 112

References

Motorcycle racing